San Jacinto is a town and municipality located in the Bolívar Department, northern Colombia.

The San Jacinto archaeological site is located near the town.

Culture

San Jacinto is the most important town in northern Colombia for local, traditional woven textiles such as hammocks and clothing as well as handicrafts. The town is also famous as the birthplace of the Latin Grammy Award winner cumbia group Los Gaiteros de San Jacinto.

References

Municipalities of Bolívar Department